Crucial may refer to:

Brands
 Crucial, a consumer products brand used by semiconductor manufacturer Micron Technology

Music
Crucial, album by Ali (British singer) (1998)
 The Crucial Conspiracy, an album by The Dingees (2001)
 The Crucial Squeegie Lip, a demo recording by Ween (1987)
 Crucial, the backing band for Judy Nylon on the album Pal Judy (1982)
 Crucial Three, a short-lived band of approximately six weeks duration in early 1977
 "Crucial" (song), by New Edition (1989)
 Crucial, a song by Prince on his box set Crystal Ball (1998)
 Crucial Star, a South Korean hip-hop artist active 2007–present